A parliamentary election was held on May 14, 1984, in the Philippines. Like past elections, charges of bribery, protests and complaints on irregularities marred the elections. Former Manila Times publisher Chino Roces and former senator and opposition leader Jose W. Diokno supported the campaign boycotting the election. The National Movement for Free Elections (NAMFREL) helped mitigate electoral fraud during the election.

The ruling Kilusang Bagong Lipunan (KBL) retained a majority in parliament, but the opposition United Nationalist Democratic Organization (UNIDO) made massive gains, winning 60 seats and reducing the KBL's majority to 114 compared to the 150 they had in 1978. This was the first Philippine election to happen after the end of the controversial martial law period from 1972 to 1981.

The opposition's success was due in most part because of the public fallout after the assassination of Benigno Aquino Jr. on August 21, 1983. His death exposed an increasingly incapable administration under President Ferdinand Marcos, exposing serious corruption and nepotism within, including from Marcos' wife Imelda, as well as exposing Marcos' worsening health at that time. As a result of Aquino's assassination and subsequent investigation, opposition became more widespread and united, rallying under his widow Corazon Aquino. The economy was also in crisis with severe poverty and debt dragging down growth, which was attributed to the Reagan administration's decision to distance itself from Marcos following Aquino's death, resulting in fewer investments that boosted the regime earlier before.

The gains from UNIDO, among other factors would force Marcos to call the for the 1986 snap presidential election, which would ultimately see him ousted following accusations of fraud, leading to Corazon Aquino becoming president.

Events leading to the Regular Batasang Pambansa elections

After the assassination of opposition leader Senator Benigno Aquino Jr. in 1983, the opposition ran for the Regular Batasang Pambansa under the United Nationalist Democratic Organization (UNIDO) and the Partido Demokratiko Pilipino-Lakas ng Bayan (PDP–Laban) against the ruling Kilusang Bagong Lipunan of Ferdinand Marcos.

Results

 Others
 Sectoral seats
 Appointed seats

See also
Commission on Elections
Politics of the Philippines
Philippine elections
Batasang Pambansa

References

External links
 The Philippine Presidency Project
 Official website of the Commission on Elections

1984
1984 elections in the Philippines